The 2021–22 Ismaily SC season was the club's 101st season in existence and the 51st consecutive season in the top flight of Egyptian football. In addition to the domestic league, Ismaily participated in this season's editions of the Egypt Cup and the EFA Cup.

Players

Transfers

In

Competitions

Overall record

Egyptian Premier League

League table

Results summary

Results by round

Matches 
The league fixtures were announced on 12 October 2021.

Egypt Cup

EFA Cup

Group stage

Knockout stage

References 

Ismaily SC seasons
Ismaily
2021 in African football
2022 in African football